Dona Maria Francisca Isabel of Savoy (21 June 1646 – 27 December 1683) was Queen of Portugal during her marriage to King Dom Afonso VI from 2 August 1666 to 24 March 1668 and, as the wife of Afonso's brother King Dom Peter II, from 12 September 1683 until her death in December that year. She married Afonso VI at the age of 20; because the marriage was never consummated, she was able to obtain an annulment. On 28 March 1668, she married the King's brother Infante Dom Peter, Duke of Beja, who was appointed prince regent the same year due to Afonso's perceived incompetence. She became queen a second time when Afonso died and Peter succeeded his brother, but she herself died three months later.

Family

Maria Francisca was born in Paris as the younger daughter of Charles Amadeus of Savoy, Duke of Nemours, and his wife, Élisabeth de Bourbon-Vendôme. Elisabeth was a granddaughter of Henry IV of France and his mistress Gabrielle d'Estrées. Her only surviving sibling was Marie Jeanne of Savoy. Prior to marriage she was styled Mademoiselle d'Aumale, a title derived from the duchy of Aumale which was a property of her father.

Queen of Afonso VI

In 1581, Portugal and Spain had been united under Philip II, but domestic opposition led to the 1640 to 1668 Portuguese Restoration War. By the end of 1665, Spanish attempts to reconquer Portugal had clearly failed, while their finances had collapsed, the Crown declaring bankruptcy no less than nine times between 1557 and 1666. 

This allowed Portuguese chief minister, Castelo Melhor, to focus on securing his own position. Afonso VI succeeded his father in 1656 but he was physically impaired and mentally unstable, with government controlled by his mother, Luisa de Guzmán. Guided by Castelo Melhor, Alfonso sent her to a convent in 1662, where she died in February 1666. 

The Portuguese government was split between pro-French and pro-English factions, respectively led by Castelo Melhor and Alfonso's younger brother, Pedro. In 1662, Charles II of England married Alfonso's sister Catherine; Castelo Melhor and Louis XIV saw a marriage between Maria Francisca and Alfonso as a way to offset that. Louis persuaded Charles to agree by providing him with the unpaid portion of Catherine's dowry; Maria arrived in Portugal on 2 August 1666 and the wedding took place the same day. 

From then on, she became known as Maria Francisca Isabel de Sabóia, although the marriage proved a disappointment. Alfonso abandoned the festivities early, leaving his new bride in charge, and reportedly displayed a similar lack of interest in consummating it. More importantly, Maria was an intelligent and resolute individual, who wanted to serve French interests but also rule; she soon discovered Alfonso was controlled by Castelo Melhor, who had no intention of sharing power. This drove her to first co-operate with her brother-in-law Pedro, then allegedly begin an affair with him. 

Although Castelo Melhor considered the marriage and the March 1667 Treaty of Lisbon with France as confirming his position, in fact they undermined it. Despite being financially exhausted, the treaty required Portugal to provide military support against Spain, while Maria persuaded Louis that Pedro was a better way to further French interests. In September, Castelo Melhor was forced into exile and in late November, Pedro deposed his brother, sending him to Terceira in the Azores. Maria retired to a convent and asked her marriage be annulled on the grounds of non-consummation; this was approved by her relative, French Cardinal Vendôme, and she married Pedro in September 1668.

Queen of Peter II
Months after her annulment, Maria Francisca married the Infante Peter, now the prince regent of Portugal. In 1669 she gave birth to a daughter, Isabel Luísa Josefa of Portugal, Princess of Beira. The Braganza dynasty was at the brink of extinction, and Peter needed heirs, yet Maria Francisca was unable to produce further issue.

When Afonso died in 1683, Peter succeeded him as Peter II of Portugal and Maria Francisca became queen again—but died in December of the same year. Maria Francisca's only child, the Infanta Isabel Luísa, died unmarried at age 21. Peter remarried to Maria Sofia of the Palatinate, who produced the much-needed heir, the future John V of Portugal.

She was first buried at the Convent of the Francesinhas, then moved in 1912 to the Pantheon of the House of Braganza at the Monastery of São Vicente de Fora.

Ancestry

References

Sources
 
 
 

|-

1646 births
1683 deaths
17th-century French women
17th-century Portuguese women
Duchesses of Beja
Duchesses of Braganza
French people of Italian descent
House of Braganza
Nobility from Paris
Portuguese queens consort
Princesses of Savoy
Remarried royal consorts
Burials at the Monastery of São Vicente de Fora